Manjamedu is a village in the pochampaill taluk of krishnagiri district, Tamil Nadu, India. It is situated on the north bank of the Ponnaiyar River.

Demographics 

 census, Manjamedu had a total population of 2377 with 1220 males and 1157 females.

References 

Villages in Ariyalur district